Nan-e nokhodchi, also called Shirini nokhodchi, are cookies made from chickpeas originating in Qazvin, Iran. These are traditionally made from chick-pea flour and flavored with cardamom and garnished with pistachio. They come in varying shapes.

Etymology 
Nan-e Nokhodchi means "bread of/with chickpea" in Persian. Shirini Nokhodchi means "chickpea cookie" in Persian.

Shape 
Some say they are traditionally cut into the shape of a clover, while others say that the traditional shape is modeled after a hazelnut with etched designs. They are also now made into squares, hearts and diamonds.

Seven Sweets 
According to legend, King Jamshid discovered sugar on the Persian new year, Nowruz. Therefore, there is the custom to celebrate Nowruz with seven sweet foods, in addition to the traditional other seven foods at the Haft-sin. The seven sweets are:

 Noghl, sugar-coated almonds flavored with rose water
 Persian Baklava, pistachio almond pastry
nan-e berenji, rice cookies
 Nan-e badami, almond cookies
 Nan-e nokhodchi, chickpea cookies
 Sohan asali, honey almonds
 Nan-e gerdui, walnut cookies

References 

Iranian desserts
Nut dishes